Ōta, Tokyo held a local election for the city assembly on April 22, 2007.

Results 

|-
! style="background-color:#E9E9E9;text-align:left;" |Parties
! style="background-color:#E9E9E9;text-align:right;" |Votes
! style="background-color:#E9E9E9;text-align:right;" |%
! style="background-color:#E9E9E9;text-align:right;" |Seats
|-
| style="text-align:left;" |Liberal Democratic Party (自由民主党, Jiyū Minshutō)
| style="text-align:right;" | 66,477.592
| style="text-align:right;" | 
| style="text-align:right;" | 19
|-
| style="text-align:left;" |New Komeito Party (公明党, Kōmeitō)
| style="text-align:right;" | 50,564.935
| style="text-align:right;" |
| style="text-align:right;" | 12
|-
| style="text-align:left;" |Japanese Communist Party (日本共産党, Nihon Kyōsan-tō)
| style="text-align:right;" | 30,689.759
| style="text-align:right;" | 
| style="text-align:right;" | 7
|-
| style="text-align:left;" |Democratic Party of Japan (民主党, Minshutō)
| style="text-align:right;" | 45,379.179
| style="text-align:right;" | 
| style="text-align:right;" | 6
|-
| style="text-align:left;" | 生活者ﾈｯﾄﾜｰｸ 
| style="text-align:right;" | 5,704
| style="text-align:right;" | 
| style="text-align:right;" | 1
|-
| style="text-align:left;" | 緑の党
| style="text-align:right;" | 4,642
| style="text-align:right;" | 
| style="text-align:right;" | 1
|-
| style="text-align:left;" |Social Democratic Party (社民党 Shamin-tō)
| style="text-align:right;" | 2,960
| style="text-align:right;" | 
| style="text-align:right;" | 1
|-
| style="text-align:left;" |Liberal Party
| style="text-align:right;" | 2,880
| style="text-align:right;" | 
| style="text-align:right;" | 1
|-
| style="text-align:left;" | Independents
| style="text-align:right;" | 4,783
| style="text-align:right;" | 
| style="text-align:right;" | 1
|-
|style="text-align:left;background-color:#E9E9E9"|Total (turnout 45.57%)
|width="75" style="text-align:right;background-color:#E9E9E9"| N/A
|width="30" style="text-align:right;background-color:#E9E9E9"| 100.00
|width="30" style="text-align:right;background-color:#E9E9E9"| 50
|-
| style="text-align:left;" colspan=4 |Source:
|}

Local elections in Japan
Ōta, Tokyo
2007 elections in Japan
April 2007 events in Japan
2007 in Tokyo